Sir Antony Rupert Jay,  (20 April 1930 – 21 August 2016) was an English writer, broadcaster, producer and director. With Jonathan Lynn, he co-wrote the British political comedies Yes Minister and Yes, Prime Minister (1980–88). He also wrote The Householder's Guide to Community Defence Against Bureaucratic Aggression (1972).

For his career as a broadcaster and in public relations, Jay received a knighthood in the 1988 New Year Honours. He also wrote the 1969 BBC television documentary Royal Family and wrote a 1992 book about Elizabeth II called Elizabeth R, after which he was appointed a Commander of the Royal Victorian Order for personal services to the Royal Family in the 1993 New Years Honours list.

Early life and education
Jay was born in Paddington, London, the son of Ernest Jay, a character actor, and Catherine (Hay) Jay. He was educated at St Paul's School and Magdalene College, Cambridge, graduating with first-class honours in Classics and comparative philology.

Career
After National Service in the Royal Signals, he joined BBC Television in 1955, and was a member of the team that launched the current affairs programme Tonight, of which he was editor from 1962–63. From 1963–64 he was Head of Television Talk Features, before leaving the BBC (on Wednesday 8 April 1964) to pursue a career as a freelance writer and producer. In 'real politics' he rendered political services to the Conservative Party of Margaret Thatcher, which included writing speeches for leading politicians including Geoffrey Howe. He was knighted in 1988 and remained a mordant observer of politics, including those of the broadcasters themselves. He was interviewed in the BBC TV documentary series Tory! Tory! Tory! and The Trap. Jay was a partner with John Cleese in the Video Arts training film production company.

Views and advocacy
Jay's political views were right-wing and he was a supporter of market economics. In 2007, he alleged anti-establishment thinking by the BBC and news media outlets such as The Guardian. He said of his time working at the BBC: "We were not just anti-Macmillan. We were anti-industry, anti-capitalism, anti-advertising, anti-selling, anti-profit, anti-patriotism, anti-monarchy, anti-Empire, anti-police, anti-armed forces, anti-bomb, anti-authority. Almost anything that made the world a freer, safer and more prosperous place, you name it, we were anti it."

His 2008 report for the Centre for Policy Studies, How to Save the BBC, advocated the abolition of the licence fee and the television service being reduced to one channel.

Books 
Jay was a prolific writer of books on management and business practices. His first best-seller, Management and Machiavelli (1967), originally sold 250,000 copies worldwide. This was followed by his seminal analysis of how business really worked in the 20th century.  Corporation Man (1971) was described at the time as "a brilliant mixture of evolutionary theory drawn from such works as African Genesis and The Naked Ape". His Householders' Guide to Community Defence Against Bureaucratic Aggression (1972) was adopted by the proletariat as the ultimate bible of dealing with bureaucracy.

Death 
Jay died on 21 August 2016 at the age of 86.

Family 
Jay married Jill Watkins in 1957; they had four children.

References

External links

Obituary in the Guardian newspaper 23 August 2016
Obituary in the Independent online newspaper 23 August 2016 
Obituary in the Telegraph newspaper 23 August 2016
New West End play by Sir Antony Jay and Jonathan Lynn, yesprimeminister.co.uk
Article by Antony for the Harvard Business Review

 

1930 births
2016 deaths
20th-century English writers
Alumni of Magdalene College, Cambridge
BBC television producers
Commanders of the Order of the British Empire
Commanders of the Royal Victorian Order
Conservative Party (UK) people
English television producers
English television writers
Knights Bachelor
People educated at St Paul's School, London
People from Paddington
Royal Corps of Signals soldiers
Writers from London
Yes Minister
20th-century British Army personnel
20th-century British businesspeople